Michael Joseph 'Roger' Hartigan (12 December 1879 – 7 June 1958) was an Australian cricketer and administrator.

Hartigan became Australia's 92nd Test debutant on 10 January 1908 for the Third Test of the 1907–08 Test series against England. Batting at number eight in the second innings, Hartigan (scoring 116) added 243 runs for the eighth wicket – still an Australian Test cricket record – with Clem Hill (160) in oppressive heat at Adelaide Oval.

Missing the Fourth Test through 'business commitments', Hartigan returned for the Fifth Test of the 1907/08 season six weeks later in Sydney scoring just 1 and 5. Although selected to play in the 1909 Ashes series in England, Hartigan performed poorly in the warm-up matches and never played Test Cricket again.

After his retirement from first-class cricket in 1921, Hartigan served on the Board of Cricket Control – forerunner of today's Cricket Australia – for 35 years, and was also chairman of the Brisbane Cricket Ground Trust. Hartigan, along with John Hutcheon, was given the credit for securing Brisbane's first ever Test Match in 1928. The match turned out to be a disaster for Australia losing by 675 runs but it did see the debut of Don Bradman for the home team.

In addition to cricket, Hartigan also represented New South Wales and Queensland in baseball, playing in Queensland's first recorded inter-state baseball series against New South Wales at the Brisbane Exhibition Ground. He also represented Queensland in lacrosse.

Hartigan died in 1958 and was buried in Brisbane's Toowong Cemetery.

References

Further reading
Harris, J.O (2009). Queensland Baseball 1905–1990. p. 20

External links

Roger Hartigan Profile — Cricinfo
 Roger Haritgan's cricket team in Cunnamulla, Queensland, 1939 — State Library of Queensland

1879 births
1958 deaths
Australia Test cricketers
New South Wales cricketers
Queensland cricketers
Cricketers who made a century on Test debut
Burials at Toowong Cemetery
Australian cricketers
Cricketers from Sydney